The Polity data series is a data series in political science research. Along with the Varieties of Democracy project and Freedom House, Polity is among prominent datasets that measure democracy and autocracy.

The Polity study was initiated in the late 1960s by Ted Robert Gurr and is now continued by Monty G. Marshall, one of Gurr's students. It was sponsored by the Political Instability Task Force (PITF) until February 2020. The PITF is funded by the Central Intelligence Agency.

The data series has been criticized for its methodology, Americentrism, and connections to the CIA. Seva Gunitsky, an assistant professor at the University of Toronto, stated that the data series was appropriate "for research that examines constraints on governing elites, but not for studying the expansion of suffrage over the nineteenth century".

Scoring chart

Scores for 2018

Criticism

The 2002 paper "Conceptualizing and Measuring Democracy" claimed several problems with commonly used democracy rankings, including Polity, opining that the criteria used to determine "democracy" were misleadingly narrow.

The Polity data series has been criticized by Fairness & Accuracy in Reporting for its methodology and determination of what is and isn't a democracy. FAIR has criticized the data series for Americentrism with the United States being shown as the only democracy in the world in 1842, being given a nine out of ten during slavery, and a ten out of ten during the Jim Crow era. The organization has also been critical of the data series for ignoring European colonialism in Africa and Asia with those areas being labeled as no data before the 1960s. FAIR has also been critical of the data series' connection to the Central Intelligence Agency. Max Roser, the founder of Our World in Data, stated that Polity IV was far from perfect and was concerned at the data series' connections with the Central Intelligence Agency.

Seva Gunitsky, an assistant professor at the University of Toronto, wrote in The Washington Post where he stated that "Polity IV measures might be appropriate for research that examines constraints on governing elites, but not for studying the expansion of suffrage over the nineteenth century". Gunitsky was critical of the data series for ignoring suffrage.

See also
Democracy-Dictatorship Index
Democracy Index
Democracy Ranking
V-Dem Democracy indices
List of democracy indices
List of freedom indices
Freedom in the World

References

External links 
Polity IV Project webpage

Democracy